Copelatus nilssoni is a species of diving beetle. It is part of the genus Copelatus in the subfamily Copelatinae of the family Dytiscidae. It was described by Wewalka in 1982.

References

nilssoni
Beetles described in 1982